"Tomorrow" is a song by the American rock band Kiss, released on their eighth studio album, Unmasked. It was released as the third single of the album on November 1, 1980. The song was never performed live.

Background
"Tomorrow" was written by the band's rhythm guitarist Paul Stanley and the album producer Vini Poncia. Although Gene Simmons is the bass guitarist in the band, Stanley played bass guitar on the track (he also played bass on "Easy As It Seems"). The song was in most countries released as third single, after "Shandi" and "Talk to Me", but in the U.S. it was released as second single ("Talk to Me" wasn't released there). It only managed to chart in Germany, reaching number 70.

Record World said that "tight harmony vocals and power-laden, throbbing guitars deliver a triumphant hook."

Track listing

International single
A-side - "Tomorrow"
B-side - "Naked City"

Austrian and German single
A-side - "Tomorrow"
B-side - "Is That You?"

Mexican single EP
Side 1:
"Tomorrow"
"Sure Know Something"

Side 2:
"Christine Sixteen"
"She"

Personnel

Paul Stanley – lead vocals, all guitars, bass
Anton Fig – drums
Vini Poncia – keyboards, clapping, backing vocals

Charts

References

Kiss (band) songs
1980 singles
Casablanca Records singles
Songs written by Vini Poncia
Songs written by Paul Stanley
1980 songs
American power pop songs